Gilbert Street may refer to:

 Gilbert Street, Adelaide, street in South Australia
  "Gilbert Street", song about the London street on Sweet Thursday (album)